Helen Flint (January 14, 1898 – September 9, 1967) was an American actress.

Flint debuted as a member of the chorus in the Ziegfeld Follies when she was 17. Her work on Broadway included more than 20 productions between 1921 and 1946.

Flint appeared in more than 20 films between 1931 and 1944. Flint often played seedy or sexually available women. Her films included Ah, Wilderness! and Black Legion. She portrayed the fortune-hunting actress Minna Tipton in David O. Selznick's production of Little Lord Fauntleroy.

Flint's career ended with an acting appearance in the comedy The Dancer (1953) in New York.

Banker H. Spencer Auguste married Flint on January 27, 1938, in Palm Beach, Florida. They were divorced in Reno, Nevada, on January 7, 1939.

On September 9, 1967, Flint died in a hospital in Washington, D. C., after being hit by a car. She was 69.

Filmography

References

External links
 

1898 births
1967 deaths
Actresses from Chicago
20th-century American actresses
American film actresses
American stage actresses
Broadway theatre people
Ziegfeld girls
Road incident deaths in Washington, D.C.